This article refers to the former software company. For the online role-playing game see MicroMUSE.

Micromuse Inc. was an American company based in San Francisco which provided network management software. The company's partners included Psytechnics.

Products
The company's products include Netcool/OMNIbus, Netcool/Impact and Netcool/RAD (Realtime Active Dashboards) which would later become members of the Tivoli Software portfolio.
Netcool/OMNIbus and Netcool/Impact continued as IBM products, keeping its original name whereas Netcool/RAD (and some other Micromuse products) were renamed Tivoli Business Service Manager (TBSM), not to be confused with an earlier IBM product named Tivoli Business Systems Manager.

History
Micromuse was founded by [Australian] Chris Dawes, in London, in 1989. Dawes was killed when his McLaren F1 car crashed in Essex, in 1999.

In June 2002, Micromuse entered into an agreement to purchase rival firm RiverSoft for £43 million. RiverSoft was founded by Phil Tee after he left Micromuse.

In December 2002, the company chairman and chief executive officer Greg Brown announced his resignation, and his move to become executive vice president of Motorola. Brown had worked for Micromuse since 1999.

In July 2003, Lloyd Carney was named CEO and chairman of the board, replacing Mike Luetkemeyer who was the interim CEO.

In July 2005, Micromuse announced an agreement to acquire GuardedNet Inc'', a computer security company based in Atlanta, for $16.2 million in cash.

In December 2005, IBM entered into an agreement to acquire Micromuse for approximately $865 million in cash.

References

Companies formerly listed on the Nasdaq
Companies based in San Francisco
IBM acquisitions
Software companies established in 1989
1989 establishments in England
Software companies based in the San Francisco Bay Area
2006 mergers and acquisitions
Defunct software companies of the United States